The Man with a Broken Ear (French:L'homme à l'oreille cassée) is a 1934 French drama film directed by Robert Boudrioz and starring Thomy Bourdelle, Jacqueline Daix and Alice Tissot. It was an adaptation of the 1862 novel by Edmond About.

Cast
 Thomy Bourdelle – Le Colonel Fougas 
 Jacqueline Daix – Clémentine 
 Alice Tissot – Mademoiselle Sambucco 
 Jim Gérald – Le capitaine des pompiers 
 Gustave Hamilton – Le docteur Renaud 
 Christiane Arnold – Madame Renaud 
 Boris de Fast – Garok 
 Jacques Tarride – Léon Renaud

References

Bibliography
 Goble, Alan. The Complete Index to Literary Sources in Film. Walter de Gruyter, 1999.

External links

1934 films
French drama films
1930s French-language films
Films based on French novels
Films directed by Robert Boudrioz
French black-and-white films
1934 drama films
1930s French films